Culpeper, Colepeper, or Culpepper is a surname, first written "de Colepeper" in the 12th century in Kent, England. Notable people with it include:

 Culpeper baronets, including:
 Sir Thomas Culpeper, 3rd Baronet (1656–1723), English politician
 Barons Colepeper, including:
 John Colepeper, 1st Baron Colepeper (d. 1660), English politician, Chancellor of the Exchequer 1643–1646
 Thomas Colepeper, 2nd Baron Colepeper (1635–1689), English colonial governor of Virginia
 Alan Culpepper (b. 1972), American distance runner, married to Shayne Culpepper
 Brad Culpepper (b. 1969), American football player
 Daunte Culpepper (b. 1977), American football player
 John Culpepper (disambiguation), also Culpeper and Colepeper
 Martin Culpepper (–1605), English clergyman, medical doctor and academic
 Marvin T. Culpepper (1908–1970), member of the Louisiana House of Representatives
 Nicholas Culpeper (1616–1654), English botanist, herbalist, physician, and astrologer
 Robert C. Culpepper (1873–1950), American politician and judge
 Shayne Culpepper (b. 1973), American middle-distance athlete
 Thomas Culpeper (disambiguation), also Culpepper and Colepeper
 William Culpepper (disambiguation)

Fictional characters
 Duncan "Dunc" Culpepper, in the Culpepper Adventures series of novels by Gary Paulsen
 Frank Culpepper, in the 1972 film The Culpepper Cattle Co.
 Isabel Culpeper, in the books The Wolves of Mercy Falls
 T. G. Culpepper, in the 1963 film It's a Mad, Mad, Mad, Mad World
 Thomas Colpeper, in the 1943 film A Canterbury Tale

References